Penicillium melinii is an anamorph species of the genus Penicillium which produces griseofulvin and beta-Nitropropionic acid.

Further reading

References 

melinii
Fungi described in 1930
Taxa named by Charles Thom